This is a list of Danish television related events from 1979.

Events
3 February - Tommy Seebach is selected to represent Denmark at the 1979 Eurovision Song Contest with his song "Disco Tango". He is selected to be the twelfth Danish Eurovision entry during Dansk Melodi Grand Prix held at the DR Studios in Copenhagen.

Debuts

International
8 June -  Doctor Who

Television shows

Ending this year

Births
25 April - Laura Bach, actress
7 June - Julie Berthelsen, singer & TV host
18 July - Sofie Lassen-Kahlke, actress
25 September - Mikkel Herforth, TV host
5 October - Robert Hansen, actor & TV host

Deaths

See also
1979 in Denmark